Ittefaq (English: Coincidence) is a 1969 Indian mystery thriller film produced by B. R. Chopra and directed by his brother Yash Chopra. The film stars Nanda and Rajesh Khanna in the lead with Sujit Kumar, Bindu, Madan Puri and Iftekhar playing supporting roles and has music by Salil Chowdhury.  The film became a "semi-hit" at the box office. The film is based on 1965 American movie Signpost to Murder. which was earlier adapted into a Gujarati drama Dhummas starring Sarita Joshi.

It was the fourth Bollywood film (after Naujawan, Munna and Kanoon) that did not have any songs in it. What was remarkable was that a previous production from the same production house, i.e. B.R.Films, namely Kanoon, made in 1960, was also a song-less film and with the same leading lady Nanda. Another common feature of both Kanoon and Ittefaq was that in both these song-less films Salil Chowdhary was the Music Director. This film is counted among the 17 consecutive hit films starring Rajesh Khanna in a lead role between 1969 and 1971, by including the two multi-starrer films Marayada and Andaz to the 15 consecutive solo hits he gave from 1969 to 1971. This is also the last film Yash Chopra would direct for his brother before branching out to form his own production company Yash Raj Films.

This was the first Hindi film that did not have any interval.

Plot
Dilip Roy (Rajesh Khanna) is a painter and is married to a rich woman, Sushma. One day while he is passionately painting, his wife comes and asks him to come out with her. He refuses and in the ensuing fight she destroys his painting. Dilip gets emotionally upset and pushes her away, saying that he would kill her and leaves the house. When he comes back, his wife is dead and the police arrest him as prime suspect on the testimony given by Renu (Bindu), his wife's sister who lives along with them. He claims that though he became enraged and can't remember well what happened, he didn't kill her.

Later, he is sent for psychological analysis on account of his erratic behavior during the trial. There, Dr. Trivedi (Gajanan Jagirdar), a psychologist examines him and decides to keep him in hospital for some more time. But on a stormy night, Dilip escapes and ends up at Rekha's (Nanda) house. Rekha is a married woman staying in a rich neighborhood, but her husband isn’t home at that time. Dilip holds her at gunpoint and demands her to hide him from police. She tries to call someone, but fails. When police come inquiring, she was forced to hide the fact that Dilip was there. Later, after some talk, Dilip asks her for forgiveness and they talk like friends for some time. He changes into other dress from his prison uniform.

Dilip, believing that Rekha wouldn't call the police, sleeps for some time in the hall. But when he wakes up at midnight after hearing a sound, he can't find Rekha. He searches for her, but finds a dead body of a young man in the bathroom. He demands an explanation from Rekha about the body, but they can't find it where it was before. Rekha tells him that everything was his imagination, but he suspects that Rekha is hiding something.

Later, after becoming sure of Rekha's deception, he calls the police and tells them that he found Mr. Jagmohan's (Rekha's husband) body in that house and that Rekha has killed her husband. But Rekha says that her husband hasn't returned from Calcutta yet. After some searching, they find Jagmohan's body outside and suspect that Dilip has killed him before entering the house. Moreover, they find Dilip's prisoner number cloth piece from his prison dress stuck with pin in Jagmohan's hands. Dilip tries to reason with them and suspects inspector Diwan (Sujit Kumar) is helping Rekha. He proves the same with the help of his cigarette lighter unconsciously taken by the inspector in one of his previous visit's to Rekha's house. Whereas the inspector had previously denied any such visit or acquaintance to Rekha. Seeing no other way out Rekha admits that she was having an affair with the inspector, her husband was murdered by them as he walked in on them and saw them together. She kills herself with a gun in guilt and remorse. At the same time, Inspector Karwe (Iftekhar) finds, with the help of piece of Renu's bracelet at the crime scene in colour palette and fingerprinting, that Renu was the real killer of Dilip's wife and he clears Dilip Roy of murder charge.

Cast
Rajesh Khanna as Dilip Roy
Nanda as Rekha 
Bindu as Renu
Sujit Kumar as Inspector Diwan
Madan Puri as Public Prosecutor Khanna
Gajanan Jagirdar as Dr. Trivedi
Iftekhar as Inspector Karwe
Jagdish Raj as Inspector Khan
Shammi as Basanti
Alka as Sushma Roy

Awards and nominations

Reboot
The film inspired the 2017 film with the same name starring Sidharth Malhotra, Sonakshi Sinha, and Akshaye Khanna. The film released on 3 November 2017.

References

External links 
 
 [http://www.yashrajfilms.com/Movies/MovieIndividual.aspx?MovieID=43017bc1-721a-40a6-9174-704aa716a901 Ittefaq] at Yash Raj Films
  Ittefaq  on YouTube

1969 films
1960s Hindi-language films
Films directed by Yash Chopra
Films scored by Salil Chowdhury
Fictional portrayals of the Maharashtra Police
Indian remakes of American films